Iðavöllr (Old Norse Iðavǫllr, possibly "splendour-plain") is a location referenced twice in Völuspá, the first poem in the Poetic Edda, as a meeting place of the gods.

Attestations
In a stanza early in the poem Völuspá, the völva who is the narrator recounts how, early in the mythological timeline, the gods met together at Iðavöllr and constructed hörgrs and hofs:
At Ithavoll met the mighty gods;
Shrines and temples they timbered high;
Forges they set, and they smithied ore,
Tongs they wrought, and tools they fashioned.

Iðavöllr is again mentioned at the end of the poem in verse 60, after the events of Ragnarök. It is once again a meeting place for the gods; however, most of them having been killed in the battle, few of the same gods return to the field. These survivors build a new city on Iðavöllr, starting with Gimlé:
The gods in Ithavoll meet together,
Of the terrible girdler of earth they talk,
And the mighty past they call to mind,
And the ancient runes of the Ruler of Gods.

Theories
Several etymologies of  Iðavöllr have been proposed, and the meaning of the name is considered unclear. If Iðavöllr is amended to *Ið[is]avöllr, the location name corresponds precisely to Idisiaviso, the amended location name where on the Weser river forces commanded by Arminius fought those commanded by Germanicus at the Battle of the Weser River in 16 CE, attested in chapter 16 of book II of Tacitus' Annales.

Notes

References

 Bellows, Henry Adams (Trans.) (1936). The Poetic Edda. Princeton University Press. New York: The American-Scandinavian Foundation.
 Orchard, Andy (1997). Dictionary of Norse Myth and Legend. Cassell. 
 Simek, Rudolf (2007) translated by Angela Hall. Dictionary of Northern Mythology.  D. S. Brewer. 

Locations in Norse mythology